Mehmood Jan (born 5 May 1969) is a Pakistani politician who served as the Deputy Speaker of the Provincial Assembly of Khyber Pakhtunkhwa, in office from August 2018 till January 2023. He had been a member of the Provincial Assembly of Khyber Pakhtunkhwa from August 2018 till January 2023. Previously, he was a member of the Provincial Assembly of Khyber Pakhtunkhwa from May 2013 to May 2018.

Early life and education
He was born on 5 May 1969 in Peshawar, Pakistan.

He has a degree of Bachelor of Arts.

Political career
He was elected to the Provincial Assembly of Khyber Pakhtunkhwa as a candidate of Pakistan Tehreek-e-Insaf (PTI) from Constituency PK-7 (Peshawar-VII) in 2013 Pakistani general election. He received 12,583 votes and defeated Hashmat Khan, a candidate of Jamaat-e-Islami Pakistan (JI).

He was re-elected to the Provincial Assembly of Khyber Pakhtunkhwa as a candidate of PTI from  Constituency PK-66 (Peshawar-I) in 2018 Pakistani general election. Following his successful election, PTI nominated him for the office of Deputy Speaker of the Khyber Pakhtunkhwa Assembly. On 15 August, he was elected as Deputy Speaker of the Khyber Pakhtunkhwa Assembly. He received 78 votes against his opponent Jamshaid Khan Mohmand who received 30 votes.

References

Living people
1969 births
Pashtun people
Khyber Pakhtunkhwa MPAs 2013–2018
People from Peshawar
Pakistan Tehreek-e-Insaf MPAs (Khyber Pakhtunkhwa)
Deputy Speakers of the Provincial Assembly of Khyber Pakhtunkhwa